Fregat (frigate) is an upper stage developed by NPO Lavochkin in the 1990s, which is used in some Soyuz and Zenit launch vehicles, but is universal and can be used as a part of a medium and heavy class launch vehicles. Fregat became operational in February 2000. Its liquid propellant engine uses UDMH and N2O4. Fregat's success rate is 97.8% (with 2 failures in 93 launches), which makes it one of the most reliable upper stages in the world. Fregat has successfully delivered more than 300 payloads into different orbits. It remains the only upper stage in the world that can place its payload into 3 or more different orbits in a single launch.

Description 
The Fregat upper stage is designed for injecting large payloads into a low, medium-height or high geosynchronous orbit. Fregat is a versatile upper stage, in addition to orbital insertion, it can be used as an escape stage to send modern space probes into interplanetary trajectories (e.g. Venus Express and Mars Express). Fregat stages are currently used as the fourth stage of some Soyuz launch vehicles. The stage can be restarted up to 7 times.

NPO Lavochkin has built many interplanetary probes, and the Fregat stage follows their design traditions. The main part of the stage is six intersecting spheres placed on a single plane, four of which contain propellants. The remaining two contain the control equipment. The main engine is placed between the spheres, so Fregat is a tightly-packed stage with a diameter much larger than its height. A set of eight struts through the tanks provide an attachment point for the payload, and also transfer thrust loads to the launcher. The Fregat stage is independent from lower stages, since it has its own guidance, navigation, attitude control, tracking, and telemetry systems. The Fregat uses storable propellants (UDMH/NTO) and can be restarted up to 7 times in flight – enabling it to carry out complex mission profiles. It can provide three-axis or spin stabilization of the spacecraft payload.

Key features 
• Autonomous – carries the whole payload delivery process itself without any assistance from Earth 
• Smart – AI of the upper stage is programmed to avoid various emergency situations by its own algorithm 
• Precise – provides almost absolute delivery accuracy right into a target orbit, due to its navigation equipment based on Glonass and GPS 
• Multiple-start ability – engine can be restarted up to 7 times, which makes possible to ensure optimal delivery or to deliver multiple payloads on different target orbits 
• Versatile – fueled tanks are being loaded before installation in launch complex, which makes Fregat compatible to any launch vehicle 
• Active lifetime up to 2 days 
• Ability to start from four spaceports : Baikonur, Vostochny, Plesetsk, and Centre Spatial Guyanais

Fregat upper stage launch statistics

Failures

August 2014 failure 

The Arianespace-operated flight of a Fregat MT ended in failure on 22 August 2014 after the vehicle deposited two EU/ESA Galileo navigation satellites into the wrong orbit. The lift off at 12:27:11 UTC from the Sinnamary launch site near Kourou, French Guiana, appeared to go well. However, a failure was only apparent later when, after the second firing of the Fregat MT upper stage had taken place, the satellites were detected as being in the wrong orbit.

The Independent Inquiry Board formed to analyze the causes of the "anomaly" announced its definitive conclusions on 7 October 2014 following a meeting at Arianespace headquarters in Évry, near Paris. The failure occurred during the flight of the Fregat fourth stage. It occurred about 35 minutes after liftoff, at the beginning of the ballistic phase preceding the second ignition of this stage. The scenario that led to an error in the orbital injection of the satellites was precisely reconstructed, as follows:

 The orbital error resulted from an error in the thrust orientation of the main engine on the Fregat stage during its second powered phase.
 This orientation error was the result of the loss of inertial reference for the stage.
 This loss occurred when the stage's inertial system operated outside its authorized operating envelope, an excursion that was caused by the failure of two of Fregat's attitude control thrusters during the preceding ballistic phase.
 This failure was due to a temporary interruption of the joint hydrazine propellant supply to these thrusters.
 The interruption in the flow was caused by freezing of the hydrazine.
 The freezing resulted from the proximity of hydrazine and cold helium feed lines, these lines being connected by the same support structure, which acted as a thermal bridge.
 Ambiguities in the design documents allowed the installation of this type of thermal "bridge" between the two lines. In fact, such bridges have also been seen on other Fregat stages now under production at NPO Lavochkin.
 The design ambiguity is the result of not taking into account the relevant thermal transfers during the thermal analyses of the stage system design.

The root cause of the failure of flight VS09 is therefore a shortcoming in the system thermal analysis performed during stage design, and not an operator error during stage assembly.

Since 22 August 2014, Soyuz ST-B launch vehicles with Fregat-MT upper stages have performed three successful launches, six Galileo navigation satellites have been inserted into their target orbits in frame of Soyuz at the Guiana Space Centre ongoing ESA programme.

July 2017 partial failure 
In July 2017, a Russian-operated rideshare flight of a Fregat upper stage ended with 9 of 72 small satellites dead-on-orbit.

November 2017 failure 
The Russian-operated flight of a Fregat upper stage ended in failure after the vehicle deposited the upper stage, a Meteor MS-1 weather satellite, and 18 secondary cubesats back into Earth's atmosphere due to the first Fregat burn being ignited with the stage in the wrong orientation. The guidance computer on the Soyuz rocket's Fregat upper stage was mis-programmed, causing it to begin an unnecessary turn that left it in the wrong orientation for a critical engine burn required to enter orbit.

Debris
The Fregats did not have enough impulse capability to de-orbit themselves after placing their payload into orbit and so several have remained in orbit as space debris. 

The Fregat-SB upper stage rocket used to launch the Russian Spektr-R satellite into orbit in 2011, broke into multiple pieces on May 8, 2020 creating even more debris than normal.

Versions

Fregat-M/Fregat-MT 
Fregat-M/Fregat-MT tanks have ball-shaped additions on the tops of the tanks.

Fregat-SB 
A version called Fregat-SB can be used with Zenit-2SB launch vehicle. This version is a variation of Fregat-M with a block of drop-off tanks ("SBB" or Сбрасываемый Блок Баков in Russian) which makes increased payload capability possible.

Fregat-SB was launched for the first time on 20 January 2011, when it lifted the Elektro-L weather satellite into geosynchronous orbit.

All versions data

References

External links 
 Fregat page on the manufacturer site

Rocket stages
Space tugs
Spacecraft that broke apart in space